Boscoe Holder (16 July 1921 – 21 April 2007), born Arthur Aldwyn Holder in Arima, Trinidad and Tobago, was Trinidad and Tobago's leading contemporary painter, who also had a celebrated international career spanning six decades as a designer and visual artist, dancer, choreographer and musician.

Living in London, England, during the 1950s and 1960s, Boscoe Holder has been credited with introducing limbo dancing and steel-pan playing to Britain, performing on British television and radio, in variety and nightclubs, in films, and at well-known theatres in the West End. His company also danced for Queen Elizabeth II at her coronation in 1953, and, two years later, at Windsor Castle.

He is considered one of the top painters from the Caribbean whose work is in many collections around the world. Particularly recognizable for his paintings of people of colour, reflecting his appreciation of Caribbean people and culture, he often used his dancers as models, his "favourite" being his wife Sheila who was also lead dancer in his company.

Early life

Born in Trinidad to Louise de Frense and Arthur Holder from Barbados, Boscoe Holder was the eldest of five children. He attended Tranquility Intermediate School and Queen's Royal College. He started a musical career at a young age, playing the piano professionally for rich French creole, Portuguese and Chinese families. In his teens, he began painting seriously. He was an early member of the Trinidad Art Society, along with people such as Ivy Hochoy, Hugh Stollmeyer and Amy Leong Pang. Holder also formed his own dance company, the Holder Dance Company. His style carefully preserved Afro-Caribbean tradition. His paintings and dances were inspired by the shango, bongo and bélé dances, of the slaves. In 1947, he visited the US, where he taught dancing at the Katherine Dunham School and exhibited his paintings at a gallery in Greenwich Village, and on his return to Trinidad, in 1948, he married Sheila Clarke, his leading dancer. Boscoe's younger brother, actor Geoffrey Holder – perhaps best known for his role as the villain Baron Samedi in the 1973 James Bond-film Live and Let Die – joined Boscoe's dance company at the age of seven.

London years
In April 1950 Holder with his wife and son went to live in London, which became their home for the next two decades, their circle of friends including Oliver Messel and Noël Coward. Holder formed a group by the name of Boscoe Holder and his Caribbean Dancers, and introduced the first steel drums to England on his own television show, Bal Creole, broadcast on BBC Television on 30 June 1950. Holder also choreographed and appeared in the 1953 BBC Television production The Emperor Jones (based on the Eugene O'Neill play of the same title).

The dance company toured all over Europe and further afield (Finland, Sweden, Belgium, France, Spain, former Czechoslovakia, Italy, Monte Carlo and Egypt), and in 1953 performed at the coronation of Queen Elizabeth II, representing the West Indies. Holder and his wife appeared again before the Queen in 1955, at a Command Performance at Windsor Castle.

On 31 July 1955, Holder and his troupe appeared in a concert billed as "The First Caribbean Carnival in London" held at the Royal Albert Hall, sponsored by entrepreneur Hugh Scotland. In January 1959, the Boscoe Holder dance troupe was a headline act, performing "Carnival Fantasia", at the "Caribbean Carnival" organised by Claudia Jones held in St Pancras Town Hall.

From 1959, for four years, Holder produced, choreographed and costumed the floorshow in the Candlelight Room of The May Fair hotel, where he also formed and led his own band, The Pinkerton Boys, who alternated there with Harry Roy's orchestra. Holder later co-owned a private club called the Hay Hill in Mayfair. He appeared in several films, including Sapphire (1959), and in television series such as Danger Man and The Saint. He also danced in Nice, Monte Carlo, and Paris with Josephine Baker. On a visit to Trinidad in December 1960, Holder with his wife Sheila Clarke put on a show entitled At Home and Abroad at Queen's Hall in Port of Spain, performed by local dancers and featuring dances based on Brazilian, Haitian and Trinidadian folklore.

As well as dancing, during these years Holder continued to paint and his work was exhibited at various UK galleries including the Trafford Gallery, the Redfern Gallery, the Commonwealth Institute, the Castle Museum Nottingham, the Martell exhibition of Paintings, Drawings and Sculpture at the Royal Watercolour Society Galleries, and the Leicester Galleries.

Return to Trinidad
After being based in London for 20 years, in 1970 Holder returned to Trinidad and quickly re-established himself as a painter, "with an unbroken record of annual shows from 1979 onwards, sometimes two, three or four in a year". His work has been exhibited all over the Caribbean and elsewhere internationally. His paintings can be seen in collections throughout the world, preserving the West Indian culture. In 1981, a Holder painting was presented by the then President of the Republic of Trinidad and Tobago, Sir Ellis Clarke, as a wedding gift from the nation to Prince Charles and Lady Diana.

In 2006 the Art Society of Trinidad and Tobago and Gallery 101 exhibited 58 works by Holder, dated from 1991 to 2002.

Personal life
In 1948 he married the dancer Sheila Davis Clarke, daughter of radio personality Kathleen Davis (a.k.a. "Aunty Kay"), and their son Christian was born the following year. Christian Holder eventually became a leading dancer with the Joffrey Ballet and an artist in his own right.

His younger brother was  the actor Geoffrey Holder – perhaps best known for his role as the villain Baron Samedi in the 1973 James Bond film Live and Let Die.

Death
Holder died at age 85 in 2007, at his home in Newtown, Port of Spain. He had suffered from prostate cancer, as well as complications from diabetes.

Awards and honours

In 1973, in recognition of Boscoe Holder's contribution to the Arts, the government of Trinidad and Tobago awarded him the Hummingbird Medal (gold) and named a street after him.

In 1978 the Venezuelan government presented him with the Francisco De Miranda award.

Then-Mayor of Washington DC declared 22 May 1983 as Boscoe Holder and Geoffrey Holder Day, in recognition of the brothers' contribution to the arts.

On 7 April 1991, Boscoe Holder, his son Christian, and brother Geoffrey received, in Philadelphia, the first Drexel University Award for International Excellence.

On 31 October 2003, Boscoe Holder was awarded an Honorary Degree of Doctor of Letters (DLitt) by the University of the West Indies.

Legacy
In December 2004 the government of Trinidad and Tobago issued an official Christmas series of postage stamps featuring six of Holder's paintings.

Holder's work was included in a 2010 exhibition in Berlin curated by Peter Doig and Hilton Als.

In October 2011, an exhibition of 50 of Boscoe Holder's artworks was dedicated at the Upper Room Art Gallery at Top of the Mount, Mount Saint Benedict, St Augustine, Trinidad, as the Gallery's contribution to the United Nations proclaiming 2011 as the International Year for People of African Descent.

In 2012, Holder's former studio at 84 Woodford Street, Port of Spain, became the "101 Art Gallery at Holder's Studio" owned by Mark Pereira.

References

Further reading
 Geoffrey MacLean, Boscoe Holder; introduction by Geoffrey Holder. Trinidad: MacLean Pub., 1994. .

External links
 Boscoe Holder biography at christianholder.com
 Summary of the life of Boscoe Holder, Trinidad Express Newspapers, 31 July 2011.
 The Art Society of Trinidad and Tobago.
 Boscoe Holder chronology and The Upper Room Art Gallery.
 "Boscoe Holder (1921–2007)", IMDb entry, including credits from three episodes of the Danger Man (US: Secret Agent) TV series.
 Stephen Bourne, Obituary, The Independent, 23 April 2007.
 John Cowley, Obituary, The Guardian, 2 May 2007.
 "Boscoe Holder Vintage Footage": Boscoe Holder singing and playing the piano; and Sheila Holder singing, with Boscoe at the piano. YouTube.
 Hilton Als, Peter Doig, and Angus Cook, "Discovering the Art of Boscoe Holder, Trinidadian Master", New York Review of Books, 3 September 2010.
 Rhoda Reddock, Address to Special Viewing and Dedication of Exhibition "Life Drawing: The Artists' Male Studies – Paintings and Drawings" – Boscoe Holder – 2 October 2011, Upper Room Art Gallery, Mt. St. Benedict, St. Augustine.
 "Drum Dance 1956", British Pathé, 12/03/1956: "Boscoe Holder's dance troupe at London's 'Cote d'Azure Club' perform some native Caribbean dancing".

1921 births
2007 deaths
Trinidad and Tobago people of Barbadian descent
People from Port of Spain
Trinidad and Tobago dancers
Trinidad and Tobago choreographers
Trinidad and Tobago musicians
Recipients of the Hummingbird Medal
Trinidad and Tobago expatriates in the United Kingdom
Deaths from prostate cancer
Deaths from cancer in Trinidad and Tobago
20th-century Trinidad and Tobago painters
21st-century Trinidad and Tobago painters
Alumni of Queen's Royal College, Trinidad
20th-century male artists
21st-century male artists